Francis Marion ("Frank") Gibbons (April 10, 1921 – July 16, 2016) was the secretary to the First Presidency of the Church of Jesus Christ of Latter-day Saints (LDS Church) from 1970 to 1986 and a church general authority from 1986 until 1991.

A native of St. Johns, Arizona, Gibbons received degrees from Stanford University and the University of Utah and practiced law in Utah for eighteen years. In 1970, Gibbons was hired as the secretary to the First Presidency to replace Joseph Anderson, who had been the secretary since 1922 but who had become an Assistant to the Quorum of the Twelve Apostles.

Gibbons served as secretary to the First Presidency until March 1986, when he retired and was succeeded by F. Michael Watson. One week later, at the church's April general conference, Gibbons was called as a general authority and member of the First Quorum of the Seventy. In April 1989, he was transferred to the newly created Second Quorum of the Seventy.

In October 1991, Gibbons was honorably released from service in the Second Quorum of the Seventy and as a general authority of the church.

Gibbons also served in the church as a bishop, stake president and patriarch. He is the author of 20 books, including a biography of Jack Anderson and the hagiographical Prophets of God series about the presidents of the LDS Church.

Gibbons was married to Helen Bay and they are the parents of four children.

Publications
 Gibbons, Francis M. (1977). Joseph Smith: Martyr–Prophet of God 
 —— (1979). Heber J. Grant: Man of Steel, Prophet of God 
 —— (1981). Brigham Young: Modern Moses, Prophet of God 
 —— (1982). Lorenzo Snow: Spiritual Giant, Prophet of God 
 —— (1984). Joseph F. Smith: Patriarch and Preacher, Prophet of God 
 —— (1985). John Taylor: Mormon Philosopher, Prophet of God 
 —— (1986). David O. McKay: Apostle to the World, Prophet of God 
 —— (1988). Wilford Woodruff: Wondrous Worker, Prophet of God 
 —— (1990). George Albert Smith: Kind and Caring Christian, Prophet of God 
 —— (1992). Joseph Fielding Smith: Gospel Scholar, Prophet of God 
 —— (1993). Harold B. Lee: Man of Vision, Prophet of God 
 —— (1995). Martha: A Historical Novel 
 —— (1995). Spencer W. Kimball: Resolute Disciple, Prophet of God 
 —— (1996). Ezra Taft Benson: Statesman, Patriot, Prophet of God 
 —— (1996). Dynamic Disciples, Prophets of God: Life Stories of the Presidents of The Church of Jesus Christ of Latter-day Saints 
 —— (1999). The Expanding Church: Three Decades of Remarkable Growth Among the Latter-Day Saints, 1970–1999 
 —— and Daniel Bay Gibbons (2002). A Gathering of Eagles: Conversions from the Four Quarters of the Earth 
 —— (2003). Jack Anderson: Mormon Crusader in Gomorrah 
 —— (2005). The Spiritual Dimensions of America 
 —— (2011). Howard W. Hunter: Man of Thought and Independence, Prophet of God 
 —— (2018). Mormon Muckraker: The Life of Jack Anderson Kindle Edition 
 —— (2018). Jesus Christ, Our Savior and Redeemer Kindle Edition

Notes

1921 births
2016 deaths
American biographers
American male biographers
American Latter Day Saint writers
Members of the First Quorum of the Seventy (LDS Church)
Members of the Second Quorum of the Seventy (LDS Church)
Patriarchs (LDS Church)
People from St. Johns, Arizona
Stanford University alumni
University of Utah alumni
Utah lawyers
Secretaries to the First Presidency (LDS Church)
American general authorities (LDS Church)
Religious leaders from Arizona
Writers from Arizona
Writers from Utah
Latter Day Saints from Arizona
Latter Day Saints from Utah
20th-century American lawyers